Anna Fricke is an American television writer and producer best known for her work on shows like Dawson's Creek, Everwood, Men in Trees and Privileged and as the co-creator of the North American version of Being Human.

Career 
In 2001, Fricke served as a writer on a failed television pilot entitled Rachels's Room. Since then she has worked as a writer and producer on a number of series, Dawson's Creek, Everwood, Men in Trees and Privileged among them. At the beginning of 2010 she teamed with her husband Jeremy Carver to develop a North American version of the British drama series Being Human, on which she  served as an executive producer and head writer. The show finished at the end of its fourth season.

Filmography

References

External links 

American women television writers
Living people
Place of birth missing (living people)
Year of birth missing (living people)
American television writers
21st-century American screenwriters
21st-century American women writers